"Sentimental" is a song by Canadian singer Deborah Cox. It was written by Cox, Colin Wolfe, and Dallas Austin for her self-titled debut studio album (1995), while production was helmed by Austin. Released as the album's lead single by Arista Records, it became a top forty success in Canada and the United Kingdom, while peaking at number 27 on the US Billboard Hot 100 and number four on the Hot R&B/Hip-Hop Songs.

Critical reception
Gil L. Robertson IV from Cash Box wrote, "This single is an impressive debut for Arista Records new soul diva. Throughout this mid-tempo track Cox delivers crisp, confident vocals that gives the song a winning edge. Expect wide urban airplay with some pop possibilities as well."

Music video
A music video was produced to promote the single. It starts off with actor Omar Epps, who stars as her ex. He is seen entering a restaurant where she is to be performing. She is shown backstage, getting ready, where she is unaware of his presence. She then goes onstage and performs, and the crowd loves it. She then goes backstage afterwards and continues singing until she drops her head. He appears in the doorway and she looks up and sees him.

Track listings

Charts

Weekly charts

Year-end charts

References

1995 debut singles
Deborah Cox songs
1995 songs
Arista Records singles
Songs written by Dallas Austin
Contemporary R&B ballads
1990s ballads
Songs written by Deborah Cox